The 1990 Boston Marathon was the 94th running of the annual marathon race in Boston, United States, which was held on April 16. The elite men's race was won by Italy's Gelindo Bordin in a time of 2:08:19 hours and the women's race was won by Portugal's Rosa Mota in 2:25:24.

A total of 7950 runners finished the race, 6516 men and 1434 women.

Results

Men

Women

References

Results. Association of Road Racing Statisticians. Retrieved 2020-04-14.

External links
 Boston Athletic Association website

Boston Marathon
Boston
Boston Marathon
Marathon
Boston Marathon